Maleknesa Khanom, also known as Ezzat ed-Dowleh or Malekzadeh Khanom (1834 or 1835 – 27 June 1905), was the daughter of Mohammad Shah Qajar and Malek Jahan Khanom, and a sister of Naser al-Din Shah Qajar. Ezzat ed-Dowleh married four times in her life.

Biography
Ezzat ed-Dowleh was born in Kahnamu near Tabriz in north west of Iran. Ezzat ed-Dowleh was married four times. The first time when she married Mirza Taghi Khan Farahani in 1849. The marriage ended after Amir Kabir was murdered on 10 January 1852. The second time she married Mirza Kazem Nezam-ol-Molk Son of Mirza Aqa Khan Nuri. The marriage lasted seven years, until Ezzat ed-Dowleh divorced her husband and was married for the third time with her cousin Anoushirvan Khan Qajar. After Anoushirvan Khan Qajar had died in 1868, Ezzat ed-Dowleh was married for the fourth times with Mirza Yahya Khan Moshir od-Dowleh in 1868. Ezzat ed-Dowleh died on 27 June 1905 and was buried in Isfahan.

Children 
Ezzat ed-Dowleh had two daughters, Taj al-Molouk and Hamdam al-Molouk from her first husband Amir Kabir.

References

Qajar princesses
1835 births
1905 deaths
Spouses of prime ministers of Iran